Gytis Juškevičius (born 22 February 1966) is a Lithuanian boxer. He competed in the men's super heavyweight event at the 1992 Summer Olympics.

References

External links
 

1966 births
Living people
Lithuanian male boxers
Olympic boxers of Lithuania
Boxers at the 1992 Summer Olympics
Sportspeople from Rokiškis
Super-heavyweight boxers